Alexandros Papanastasiou (born 12 February 1999) is a Greek water polo player. He competed in the 2020 Summer Olympics, where he won a silver medal as a member of the Greek team.

Honours

Club
Jug Dubrovnik 
Croatian Championship: 2018–19, 2019–20, 2021–22
Croatian Cup: 2018–19
Olympiacos
Greek Cup: 2022–23

References

1999 births
Living people
Water polo players from Athens
Water polo players at the 2020 Summer Olympics
Greek male water polo players
Olympic water polo players of Greece
Water polo players at the 2015 European Games
European Games bronze medalists for Greece
European Games medalists in water polo
Medalists at the 2020 Summer Olympics
Olympic silver medalists for Greece
Olympic medalists in water polo
World Aquatics Championships medalists in water polo